The Black Magic Show is the second and final album by the American indie rock band Elefant. It peaked at #14 on the Billboard Top Heatseekers chart.

The third track, "Lolita", is based loosely on the novel of the same name by Vladimir Nabokov.

Critical reception

The Black Magic Show was met with "mixed or average" reviews from critics. At Metacritic, which assigns a weighted average rating out of 100 to reviews from mainstream publications, this release received an average score of 55 based on 10 reviews.

Writing for AllMusic, MacKenzie Wilson explained: "While this album doesn't do anything drastic on an artistic level, The Black Magic Show does feature some danceable style. A little more sincerity and a little less swagger might have been nice, though."

Track listing

Charts

References

External links
 
 Review by Papermag.com

2006 albums
Elefant (band) albums